The Roman Catholic Vicariate Apostolic of Darién was erected on 29 November 1925.

Ordinaries
Juan José Maíztegui y Besoitaiturria, C.M.F. (1926 - 1932)
José María Preciado y Nieva, C.M.F. (1934 - 1955)
Jesús Serrano Pastor, C.M.F. (1956 - 1981)
Carlos María Ariz Bolea, C.M.F. (1981 - 1988)
Rómulo Emiliani Sánchez, C.M.F. (1988 - 2002)
Pedro Joaquin Hernández Cantarero, C.M.F. (2005 - )

Territorial losses

External links and references

Darien
Darien
Darien
Darién